Sanqoz-e Pain (also Romanized as Sanqoz-e Pā’īn; also known as Sanqor-e Pā’īn) is a village in Miankuh Rural District, Chapeshlu District, Dargaz County, Razavi Khorasan Province, Iran. At the 2006 census, its population was 42, in 10 families.

References 

Populated places in Dargaz County